T. J. Saneesh Kumar Joseph is an Indian politician from Kerala and a member of the Indian National Congress. He is a member of the Kerala Legislative Assembly from Chalakudy.

References

Indian National Congress politicians from Kerala
Living people
Year of birth missing (living people)
Kerala MLAs 2021–2026